Steven Phillip Baron (born December 7, 1990) is an American former professional baseball catcher. He was drafted by the Seattle Mariners in the first round, 33rd pick overall, of the 2009 Major League Baseball draft and made his Major League Baseball (MLB) debut in 2015. He attended Ferguson High School and has also played in MLB for the St. Louis Cardinals and Pittsburgh Pirates.

Career

Amateur career
Baron attended John A. Ferguson Senior High School in Miami, Florida.  He was considered the best defensive catcher in the '09 draft and was awarded the 2009 Rawlings Gold Glove award. Baseball America ranked him #77 amongst the top 100 prospects in the 2009 draft. He committed to play college baseball at Duke University, but was selected by the Seattle Mariners with the 33rd overall selection of the 2009 Major League Baseball draft.

Seattle Mariners
In his first professional season, 2009, Baron played for the Rookie-Level Pulaski Mariners of the Appalachian League. He batted .179 with 19 hits, six doubles, two home runs and 13 RBIs in 30 games. In his first full season, he led all of minor league baseball in catcher caught stealing with 46%.   Baron made his MLB debut in 2015. He is one of three catchers in Major League history to catch a one-hit major league shutout in his first ever start.  He was designated for assignment by the Mariners on November 2, 2016. On November 10, he was released. Baron signed a new minor league contract with the Mariners later in November.

St. Louis Cardinals
He elected free agency on November 6, 2017, and signed a minor league contract with the St. Louis Cardinals on December 22. He played with the team's AAA affiliate, the Memphis Redbirds in 2018, until being recalled on May 17 due to Carson Kelly being placed on the disabled list. His first major league hit, a single, came on May 19, 2018, off of Luis García of the Philadelphia Phillies.

Pittsburgh Pirates
On December 18, 2018, Baron signed a minor league deal with the Pittsburgh Pirates. On September 3, 2019, the Pirates selected his contract. Baron was outrighted off the Pirates roster on October 25 and elected free agency on October 31.

Cleveland Indians
On July 3, 2020, Baron signed a minor league contract with the Cleveland Indians organization. He was released by the Indians on September 20, 2020.

References

External links

1990 births
Living people
Baseball players from Miami
Major League Baseball catchers
Seattle Mariners players
St. Louis Cardinals players
Pittsburgh Pirates players
Pulaski Mariners players
Clinton LumberKings players
Everett AquaSox players
High Desert Mavericks players
Jackson Generals (Southern League) players
Tacoma Rainiers players
Arkansas Travelers players
Memphis Redbirds players
Indianapolis Indians players